Susqueda is a municipality in the comarca of the Selva in Catalonia, Spain. It is located in the Guilleries Massif area, on the left bank of the Ter river in the north-west of the comarca. The Susqueda reservoir is on the municipal territory, and the associated hydroelectric power station is an important source of local income. A local road links the municipality with the C-152 road to Santa Coloma de Farners.

Demography

References

 Panareda Clopés, Josep Maria; Rios Calvet, Jaume; Rabella Vives, Josep Maria (1989). Guia de Catalunya, Barcelona: Caixa de Catalunya.  (Spanish).  (Catalan).

External links 
Official website 
 Government data pages 

Municipalities in Selva
Populated places in Selva